Igrovka is a rural locality (a village) in Orlovsky Selsoviet, Yanaulsky District, Bashkortostan, Russia. The population was 80 as of 2010. There is 1 street.

Geography 
Igrovka is located 23 km southeast of Yanaul (the district's administrative centre) by road. Nikolsk is the nearest rural locality.

References 

Rural localities in Yanaulsky District